Sintu Manjezi (born 7 April 1995 in East London, South Africa) is a South African rugby union player for the  in the Pro14 and the  in the Currie Cup. His regular position is lock or blindside flanker.

Rugby career

2011–13: Under-16 and Under-18 rugby

Manjezi played rugby for his secondary school, St. Andrew's College in Grahamstown, playing for the first team between 2011 and 2013, captaining the side in 2013.

He earned his first provincial selection in 2011, when he represented the Eastern Province at the Under-16 Grant Khomo Week held in Queenstown. He started all three of their matches and scored a try in their game against . After the tournament, he was included in a South African Under-16 High Performance squad.

In 2012, despite still being in the Under-17 age group, he was selected to represent Eastern Province Country Districts at the premier schools tournament in South Africa, the Under-18 Craven Week, held in Port Elizabeth, starting a 28–27 victory over Griquas Country Districts. He returned to the 2013 edition of the tournament held in Polokwane.

2014–: Under-19, Under-21 and Currie Cup rugby

In 2014, he joined the Eastern Province academy; he was included in the  squad that participated in Group A of the 2014 Under-19 Provincial Championship for the first time following promotion from Group B at the end of 2013. He immediately established himself as a key player for the team and started all twelve of their matches in the number five jersey. He helped them to sixth position on the log, winning four of their twelve matches.

Honours
 Currie Cup winner 2020–21

Cricket

In addition to playing rugby, Manjezi also played cricket at youth provincial level, representing the Eastern Province Under-19 team in 2012 and 2013.

References

1996 births
Living people
Alumni of St. Andrew's College, Grahamstown
Blue Bulls players
Bulls (rugby union) players
Cheetahs (rugby union) players
Eastern Province Elephants players
Free State Cheetahs players
Griquas (rugby union) players
Rugby union flankers
Rugby union locks
Rugby union players from East London, Eastern Cape
South African rugby union players
Southern Kings players
Glasgow Warriors players